Jørgen Mandix (15 January 1759 – 8 August 1835) was a Danish-born Norwegian judge.

He was born in Copenhagen to Mauritz Mandix and Lucie Marie Ursin. He graduated as cand.jur. in 1782, and was named as a Supreme Court Justice from 1814. He served as Chief Justice of the Supreme Court of Norway from 1831 to 1835.

References

1759 births
1835 deaths
Lawyers from Copenhagen
Danish emigrants to Norway
Supreme Court of Norway justices
19th-century Norwegian judges